The Massachusetts Bay Transportation Authority bus division operates bus routes in the Boston, Massachusetts metropolitan area. All routes connect to MBTA subway, MBTA Commuter Rail, and/or other MBTA bus services. Many routes are descendants of the streetcar routes of the Boston Elevated Railway, or of suburban companies including the Eastern Massachusetts Street Railway, Middlesex and Boston Street Railway, and Newton and Boston Street Railway.

A number of routes have been temporarily suspended or placed on modified routings during the COVID-19 pandemic. While overall service levels were restored to pre-COVID levels in 2021, some routes remain modified or suspended. Since 2018, the MBTA has been planning a major bus network overhaul, with implementation expected to complete in 2028.

Key

Silver Line

The Silver Line is a bus rapid transit system marketed as rapid transit. It is divided into two branches: Waterfront service (SL1, SL2, SL3, and the rush-hour Shuttle) that runs through the South Boston Transitway tunnel, and Washington Street service (SL4 and SL5) that runs on the surface via Washington Street. The Waterfront service costs the same as a subway fare, while the Washington Street service costs a regular bus fare.

The SL5 route was created in 2002 as a replacement for the Washington Street Elevated. The Shuttle route began operations in 2004, followed by the SL2 and SL3 (former) in 2004 and SL1 in 2005 when dual-mode buses became available. The SL4 was introduced in 2009 as a replacement for the canceled Phase III tunnel. A new SL3 route to Chelsea opened in 2018.

Crosstown

The crosstown (CT) buses provide limited-stop service on two routes that connect major subway and bus transfer points. The routes were created by the MBTA in 1994.

1–121

These routes provide almost all local service in the core of the metropolitan area; most were originally Boston Elevated Railway streetcar routes.  They were originally numbered roughly clockwise from southeast to northeast, with 4 the furthest south in South Boston and 121 the furthest north (roughly) in East Boston.  The BERy folded into the Metropolitan Transit Authority in 1947, and the M.T.A. in turn was reorganized as the MBTA in 1964.  Despite some changes, including minor routes being merged into trunk routes, the core service network has remained roughly intact since the BERy eta.  Several new routes, including the 1, 5, and 47, have been added during the M.T.A. and MBTA eras.

Seven routes – the 52, 59, 61, 62, 67, 70, and 76 – serve more distant western suburbs, such as Belmont, Lexington, and Needham; most were acquired from the Middlesex and Boston Street Railway in 1972, and subsequently renumbered using previously discontinued designations.

Fifteen of these routes (those with the highest ridership in the system) are designated as key bus routes; they supplement the subway system to provide frequent service to the densest areas of the city. Key bus routes typically operate at higher frequencies than their undesignated cousins, and in March 2014 their hours of service were extended until 2:30AM on Friday and Saturday nights along with the rapid transit system. In mid-2015, late-night service on some key bus routes was cut back, while other routes were dropped from late-night service. Key bus routes are designated on this list with an *.

131–137

Numbers from 131 to 137 operate in the Melrose area; their routings are based on routes operated as part of the former Eastern Massachusetts Street Railway, which was folded into the MBTA system in 1968. The 136 and 137 were briefly operated as far as Lowell and Lawrence, their original Eastern Mass terminals, while under MBTA control; the 136 has since been combined with the 137. The 132 was a Service Bus Lines route which was not operated by the MBTA until 1975.

170–171

170 and 171 are special low-service routes, the 170 a variant of the 70 introduced in 1968 and the 171 a replacement for early morning CT3 service when it was cut back from Logan Airport in 2002. Other numbers in the 170s were used for largely short-lived routes serving industrial areas.

191–194
Routes from 191 to 194 are single round trips in the early morning, mainly meant for subway fare collectors but open to the public. They were introduced by the M.T.A. in 1960.

195
Route 195 is a special low-service route not open to the general public nor shown on MBTA maps. It connects downtown Boston with the homeless shelter at Lemuel Shattuck Hospital. Until September 2015, the route was numbered 277 to match routes 274-276 (which connected downtown Boston to the Long Island Health Campus and were suspended due to the closure of Long Island Bridge in October 2014).

201–202
The 20 belt route was created by the M.T.A. in 1962 as a combination of the 20 and 21 stub routes inherited from BERy. In 2005, the MBTA redesignated the two directions of the loop as the 201 and 202 to avoid confusion about which way each bus ran.

210–245
These routes operate in the Quincy area.  Routes 210-245 are based on routes originally operated by the Eastern Massachusetts Street Railway (folded into the MBTA in 1968) which mostly ran into Fields Corner station.  When the Red Line's Braintree Branch opened in the 1970s, these routes were rerouted to terminate at the new rapid transit stations (principally Quincy Center).

325–326

These routes operate express between Medford and downtown Boston. They were introduced by the MBTA in June 1973.

350–354

These routes operate in the Burlington area.  They are the remains of the Eastern Massachusetts Street Railway's Lowell Division, which was inherited intact by the MBTA in 1968 and gradually declined thereafter.

411–465
These routes operate in the Lynn area and the North Shore. Two routes that run to Haymarket have weekend short-turn variants (labeled with a W suffix) that terminate at Wonderland. The 411 and 430 were Service Bus Lines routes that were acquired by the MBTA in 1975; the other routes are largely Eastern Massachusetts Street Railway routes acquired in 1968.

501–558
These routes operate express between Newton and downtown Boston via the Massachusetts Turnpike (I-90). The 500 series routes were created by the MBTA in the 1960s to take advantage of the newly constructed turnpike extension into Boston. The 550 series routes were Middlesex and Boston Street Railway routes to Newton Corner that were extended to downtown Boston in the 1960s and taken over by the MBTA in 1972.

Privately operated routes

The MBTA provides partial subsidy for some suburban routes outside its usual service area that connect with MBTA bus, subway, or commuter rail service. Routes 710-716 are radial commuter routes that accept MBTA passes on CharlieTickets only; they were taken over from various private operators (Hudson Bus Lines for the 710 and 716, Rapid Transit Inc. for the 712/713, and Nantasket Transportation for the 714).

The non-numbered routes (listed here by their designator on MBTA maps) are local circulator services founded by the municipalities with partial MBTA subsidy. All are operated by private companies under contract, except for the Beverly Shuttle which is operated by the Cape Ann Transportation Authority.

References

External links

MBTA – Bus schedules and maps
MBTA – System maps

MBTA bus routes
Bus routes MBTA
MBTA
MBTA